Emma L. Briant (born 1979) is a British scholar and academic researcher on media, contemporary propaganda, surveillance and information warfare who was involved in exposing the Facebook–Cambridge Analytica data scandal concerning data misuse and disinformation. She is an associate researcher at Bard College and teaches in the School of Communication at American University. Briant became an honorary associate in Cambridge University Center for Financial Reporting & Accountability, headed by Prof. Alan Jagolinzer,  and joined Central European University, as a Fellow in the Center for Media, Data and Society in 2022.

Education 
Briant graduated from Coventry University in 2003, before completing two master's degrees at Glasgow Caledonian University, and University of Glasgow where she then was part of Glasgow Media Group, and she then achieved a doctorate from the University of Glasgow in Sociology 2011. Briant's doctoral thesis examined the development of military and intelligence propaganda in the US and UK during the "War on Terror" as militaries adapted to changing technology.

Media, political propaganda and human rights 
While at Glasgow Media Group Briant advanced several studies on media representation and human rights, this included the study Bad News for Disabled People, on which she was first author with Greg Philo and Nick Watson. Bad News for Disabled People examined how disability was represented in the UK media and how increasingly stereotyped and hostile representation of people with disabilities was pushed by the right wing press to advance political discourses aimed at justifying Conservative Government disability welfare benefit austerity cuts following the 2008 financial crash. The study showed the detrimental impact this had on public perceptions of disabled people as 'frauds' and real world impacts on their lives. She then authored her first book, Bad News for Refugees, with Greg Philo and Pauline Donald which examined false and misleading media narratives of migration and refugees as well as their impacts on migrants and their communities in the build up to the European refugee crisis. She continued to research media bias and disinformation on human rights issues, and in particular false representation of asylum and refugees in the UK media and political rhetoric and disinformation in the lead up to Brexit. This research focus culminated in her submissions to inquiries including revealing the role of Cambridge Analytica and Leave.EU in the 2016 British Brexit Referendum. Her expert insights and research on these subjects have been widely reported and discussed in the media including the BBC, The Times of London, and The Observer.

Propaganda, international security and changing technology 
In 2015, while lecturer in journalism studies at University of Sheffield, Briant published her second book, Propaganda and Counter-Terrorism: Strategies for Global Change, based on her doctoral thesis. The book examines British and United States governments' attempts to adapt their propaganda strategies to global terrorist threats in a rapidly changing media environment. It discusses Anglo-American coordination and domestic struggles that brought in far-reaching changes to propaganda, largely in isolation from public debate. She continues to publish both on language and definitions of propaganda; strategy and tactics in influence operations; ethics of data use and surveillance in the context of political campaigns, international security and conflicts. In addition to several scholarly articles and policy reports, Briant has also written op-eds and journalistic articles for outlets including the Organized Crime and Corruption Reporting Project, Open Democracy, The Conversation, the Ottawa Citizen and Guardian.

Briant sits on the advisory board of Campaign to Clean up the Internet 

Briant is co-founder of Women in Disinformation a network of women researchers.

Briant began running a YouTube show in 2021 called Afternoon Tea and Truth Biscuits. The show has had guests including journalists and experts on propaganda, technology and disinformation.

The Facebook–Cambridge Analytica data scandal 
In 2018, while she was a senior lecturer at University of Essex, Briant was centrally involved in revealing the Facebook–Cambridge Analytica data scandal, a global disinformation and data scandal involving Facebook, the campaign firm Cambridge Analytica, that worked for Donald Trump and on the Brexit campaigns, and its defense contractor parent firm SCL Group. Briant had spent years researching and interviewing the parent firm SCL Group as part of her research for her book Propaganda and Counter-terrorism and had then begun researching how their methodology had been used in political campaigns including by subsidiary firm Cambridge Analytica. Briant was requested to give testimony and evidence regarding the firms' data misuse and disinformation to multiple inquiries including the UK Parliament Digital Culture Media and Sport Select Committee's Inquiry into Fake News and the US Senate Judiciary Committee. Her work contributed to 2019 Oscar-shortlisted film on Facebook and Cambridge Analytica in the 2016 United States elections, The Great Hack, for which she was senior researcher. Briant also reported in Byline Times based on her detailed investigation how the Financial Times newspaper covered up its relationship with Cambridge Analytica which it hired to analyze subscriber data. In 2021 Briant was extensively interviewed on-screen for the documentary film series Schattenwelten (Shadow Worlds) by ZDF about the hidden world of influence operations, and the activities of firms including SCL Group and Cambridge Analytica.

Major works 

Emma Briant, Greg Philo and Nick Watson Bad News for Disabled People (Inclusion London, 2011)
 Greg Philo, Emma Briant, Pauline Donald, Bad News for Refugees (Pluto Press, 2013),
 Emma Briant Propaganda and Counter-Terrorism: Strategies for Global Change, (Manchester University Press, 2015).
 Emma Briant Propaganda Machine: Inside Cambridge Analytica and the Digital Influence Industry. (Bloomsbury, 2020).
 Contribution to The Great Hack for which she was Senior Researcher.

References

External links 

Living people
Propaganda theorists
Internet theorists
British women sociologists
British mass media scholars
Communication scholars
Works about security and surveillance
21st-century British women writers
Media critics
Mass media scholars
Media studies writers
Digital media educators
British women journalists
Alumni of the University of Glasgow
Date of birth missing (living people)
1979 births